Beaman Glacier is a tributary to Ebbe Glacier lying close north of McLean Glacier in the southwest part of the Anare Mountains, a major mountain range situated within the geographical borders of Victoria Land, Antarctica. The glacier was so named by the Advisory Committee on Antarctic Names for First Lieutenant Charles W. Beaman, USA, helicopter pilot who flew missions in support of the United States Geological Survey Topo West survey of this area in the 1962–63 season. The glacier lies situated on the Pennell Coast, a portion of Antarctica lying between Cape Williams and Cape Adare.

See also
 List of glaciers in the Antarctic
 Glaciology

References
 

Glaciers of Pennell Coast